Thomas Odoyo Migai (born 12 May 1978) is a former Kenyan cricketer and a former One Day International captain. He is a right-handed batsman and a right-handed medium-fast bowler, often regarded as the best ever bowler produced by Kenya in international arena.

International career 
Having represented Kenya in the 1996 World Cup, Odoyo's performances have since been critical to the team. His powerful batting throughout the middle-order and his seam bowling has led to Kenyan commentators labelling him the "Black Botham". Odoyo has since formed a bowling partnership with Martin Suji, and in 1997–98 set a then-world record One Day International (ODI) seventh-wicket stand of 119 with Suji's brother Tony.

He was the first player from a non-Test nation to score 1,500 runs and take 100 wickets in ODIs. Though injury forced him out of the Carib Beer Cup in 2003–04, he played once again for the 2004 ICC Champions Trophy

Odoyo performed well in Kenya's tour of Zimbabwe in 2006. He scored a few runs and took 8 wickets in 4 matches as Kenya drew the series with Zimbabwe at 2–2. In Thomas Odoyo was selected as captain of The Northern Nomads franchise in Kenya's domestic cricket competition the Sahara Elite League.

Coaching career 

Odoyo was appointed the national cricket team's assistant coach under Robin Brown as well as head coach of Kenya national under-19 cricket team in September 2012.

In March 2016, Odoyo was named as interim head coach of  Kenya national cricket team replace Sibtain Kassamali. His support squad former teammate Lameck Onyango

In February 2018, Kenya finished in sixth and last place in the 2018 ICC World Cricket League Division Two tournament and were relegated to Division Three. As a result, Odoyo resigned as coach of the Kenyan team.

References

External links
 

1978 births
Living people
Cricketers from Nairobi
Kenyan cricketers
Kenya One Day International cricketers
Kenyan cricket captains
Kenya Twenty20 International cricketers
Northern Nomads cricketers
ACA African XI One Day International cricketers
Cricketers at the 1996 Cricket World Cup
Cricketers at the 1998 Commonwealth Games
Cricketers at the 1999 Cricket World Cup
Cricketers at the 2003 Cricket World Cup
Cricketers at the 2007 Cricket World Cup
Cricketers at the 2011 Cricket World Cup
Alumni of City High School, Nairobi
Commonwealth Games competitors for Kenya
Kenyan cricket coaches
Coaches of the Kenya national cricket team